Alessandri is an Italian surname. Notable people with the surname include:

 Alessandri family of Chile
 Alessandro Alessandri (1461–1523), Italian jurist
 Ana Fani Alessandri Carlos, Brazilian geographer
 Angelo Alessandri (born 1969), Italian politician
 Arturo Alessandri (1868-1950), Chilean President
 Felice Alessandri (1747–1798), Italian composer
 Fernando Alessandri (1897–1982), Chilean politician
 Fiona Alessandri (born 1967), Australian swimmer.
 Gaspare Alessandri (1908–1997), Italian boxer 
 Giovanni Mario Alessandri (16th century), Italian Hispanist and grammarian
 Gustavo Alessandri Valdés (1929-2017), Chilean politician and lawyer
 Hernan Alessandri (1900-1982), Chilean physician
 Innocente Alessandri (18th century), Italian engraver
 Jorge Alessandri (1896–1986), Chilean President
 Lodovico Alessandri (born 1903, date of death unknown), Brazilian fencer
 Madeleine Alessandri CMG (born 1965), British civil servant
 Marcel Alessandri (1895–1968), French army officer
 Nerio Alessandri (1961), Italian entrepreneur

See also 
 Palazzo degli Alessandri, early-Renaissance-style palace located in Florence, Italy
 Palazzo degli Alessandri, Viterbo, 13th-century palace located in central Viterbo, Italy

Italian-language surnames
Patronymic surnames
Surnames from given names